Craige Roberts (born February 20, 1949) is an American linguist, known for her work on pragmatics and formal semantics.

Education and career 
Roberts earned her A.B. at Indiana University in 1979. She received her Ph.D. at the University of Massachusetts, Amherst in 1987, under the supervision of Barbara Partee. She is an Emeritus Professor at the Department of Linguistics of Ohio State University.

Her work in the areas of pragmatics and formal semantics explores how meaning is conveyed through anaphora, definiteness, and specificity of referring expressions, the modeling of presupposition and implicature, and methods for capturing modality, mood, tense, and aspect of verbs in language.

Awards and distinctions 

In 2015 Roberts and co-investigators David Beaver, Mandy Simons, and Judith Tonhauser were awarded a National Science Foundation (NSF) Collaborative Grant for the project “What’s the question? A cross-linguistic investigation into compositional and pragmatic constraints on the question under discussion.”  In 2010 Roberts and Judith Tonhauser received an NSF award to study the semantics and pragmatics of projective meaning across languages.

Roberts's 2013 paper, "Toward a taxonomy of projective content," coauthored with Judith Tonhauser, David Beaver, and Mandy Simons won the 2013 Best Paper in Language (journal) Award from the Linguistic Society of America.

Roberts was a Senior Fellow at the Institute for Advanced Study at Central European University in 2014–2015.  

She has served on the editorial board of Semantics and Pragmatics, the Baltic International Yearbook of Cognition, Logic and Communication, and is an Associate Editor for Linguistics and Philosophy.  

Roberts is a member of the Linguistic Society of America, serving as the co-chair for the Committee on the Status of Women in Linguistics (COSWL) from 1990 to 1993.

Publications 

 2013. J Tonhauser, D Beaver, C Roberts, M Simons. Toward a taxonomy of projective content, Language 89 (1), 66-109
 2012. C Roberts. Information structure: afterword, Semantics and Pragmatics 5, 7-1-19
 2012. C Roberts. Topics. Semantics: An International Handbook of Linguistics and Communication
 2012. C Roberts. Only: A case study in projective meaning. The Baltic International Yearbook of Cognition, Logic and Communication
 2010. M Simons, J Tonhauser, D Beaver, C Roberts. What projects and why, Semantics and linguistic theory 20, 309-327
 2009. C Roberts, M Simons, D Beaver, J Tonhauser. Presupposition, conventional implicature, and beyond: A unified account of projection. Proceedings of the ESSLLI 2009.
 2007. P Amaral, C Roberts, EA Smith. Review of the logic of conventional implicatures by Chris Potts, Linguistics and Philosophy 30 (6), 707-749
 2006. C Roberts. Only, presupposition and implicature Journal of Semantics
 2004. C Roberts. Context in dynamic interpretation, The handbook of pragmatics, 197-220
 2004. C Roberts. Pronouns as definites
 2003. C Roberts. Uniqueness in definite noun phrases. Linguistics and philosophy 26 (3), 287-350
 2002. C Roberts. Demonstratives as definites. Information sharing: Reference and presupposition in language generation and interpretation.
 2000. A Cipria, C Roberts. Spanish imperfecto and pretérito: Truth conditions and aktionsart effects in a Situation Semantics. Natural Language Semantics 8 (4), 297-347
 1998. C Roberts. Focus, the flow of information, and universal grammar Syntax and Semantics, Vol 29, 109-160
 1997. C Roberts. Anaphora in intensional contexts
 1996. C Roberts. Information structure in discourse: Towards an integrated formal theory of pragmatics. Working Papers in Linguistics-Ohio State University.
 1995. C Roberts. Domain restriction in dynamic semantics. Quantification in natural languages, 661-700
 1989. C Roberts. Modal subordination and pronominal anaphora in discourse Linguistics and philosophy 12 (6), 683-721 546
 1987. C Roberts. Modal subordination, anaphora, and distributivity
 1981. A Valdman, S Yoder, C Roberts, Y Joseph. Haitian Creole-English-French Dictionary Indiana Univ Creole Inst

References

External links
Faculty web page: https://www.asc.ohio-state.edu/roberts.21/

Living people
Linguists
Semanticists
Linguists from the United States
University of Massachusetts Amherst College of Humanities and Fine Arts alumni
Ohio State University faculty
1949 births
Women linguists